In episodic television, the term mystery box show or puzzle box show refers to a genre of high concept fiction that features large and complex stories based on enigmatic happenings and secrets, with multiple interlocking sub-plots and sets of characters that eventually reveal an underlying mythos that binds everything together.

Lost and The X-Files have been cited as  early examples of mystery box TV. Other examples of the mystery box genre include Dark, Fringe, Westworld, Heroes, Manifest, 1899 and Stranger Things.

J. J. Abrams and Damon Lindelof have been cited as examples of creators of multiple mystery box shows.

References 

Television terminology
Television genres